Fame Us is a 2019 released feature-length documentary about society's obsession with fame and social media, and how the two collide.  The documentary was written and directed by Australian filmmaker Lincoln Fenner.

The film includes interviews with David Hasselhof, former president Ronald Reagan's son Michael Reagan, Anthony Crivello, actor Jon Polito, boxing referee Joe Cortez, actor Tony Lo Bianco, Scott Alswang (retired United States Secret Service Supervisory Special Agent), TV journalist and author Diane Diamond, actor and producer J.J. Kandel, and bass guitarist Ralph Rieckermann.

In 2019 the film was released for streaming on Amazon Prime in the US and the UK as well as streaming worldwide on Vimeo On-Demand.

Fenner attended a Director's Q&A at the New York Premiere of Fame Us at the Tribeca Film Center in 2018 along with interviewees Scott Alswang and Diane Dimond. The Q&A Panel was chaired by ComedyCures Foundation CEO Saranne Rothberg.

The film had its world premiere on 16 October 2017 at UK’s longest running cinema the Phoenix Cinema in London.

The documentary’s Australian premiere was in Perth, Western Australia on 3 January 2018 at Hoyts Garden City attended by celebrity chef and two time World Pizza Champion Theo Kalogeracos who was interviewed along with Lincoln Fenner on the red carpet. Kalogeracos featured in the film.

Fame Us was written, directed, produced and edited by Fenner and the musical score was composed by Michael Alllen. The documentary was shot with a small crew including Andrew Hooper (Cinematographer), Joshua MacKenzie (Sound Recordist), at various locations in the US (New York, Los Angeles, Las Vegas, San Francisco, San Diego, Pennsylvania), United Kingdom (London, Brighton) and Australia (Perth).

References

External links 

Interview on Sonshine Radio with Writer/ Director - Lincoln Fenner

2017 films
American documentary films
Australian documentary films
British documentary films
2010s English-language films
2010s American films
2010s British films